Joseph Matthew Long (born 21 May 1997) is an English professional golfer. He won the 2020 Amateur Championship. Since turning professional in 2021, he has played on the Sunshine Tour and the Challenge Tour.

Amateur career
Long was runner-up in the 2018 English Amateur, losing, 6 and 5, to Thomas Thurloway in the final. In the 2020 English Amateur, he led after the stroke-play stage to be ranked as the top seed going into the match-play; he was ultimately knocked out in the quarter-finals at the 23rd hole.

Long won the 2020 Amateur Championship at Royal Birkdale, beating Joe Harvey, 4 and 3, in the final. The win gave him an entry into the 2021 Masters Tournament, U.S. Open and The Open Championship.

Long was selected for the 2021 Walker Cup, but only played in the final-day singles session due to "gastrointestinal issues" that impacted both teams. He won his match against John Pak on the 18th hole.

Professional career
Long turned professional in 2021.

In August 2022, Long finished runner-up at the Vodacom Origins of Golf at De Zalze, two shots behind winner George Coetzee.

Amateur wins
2020 The Amateur Championship

Source:

Results in major championships

CUT = missed the halfway cut

Team appearances
Amateur
Walker Cup (representing Great Britain and Ireland): 2021

References

External links

English male golfers
Sunshine Tour golfers
Sportspeople from Bristol
1997 births
Living people